The Elder Conservatorium of Music, also known as "The Con", is Australia's senior academy of music and is located in the centre of Adelaide, the capital of South Australia. It is named in honour of its benefactor, Sir Thomas Elder. Dating in its earliest form from 1883, it has a history in professional training for musical performance, musical composition, research in all fields of music, and music education. The Elder Conservatorium of Music and its forerunners have been parts of the University of Adelaide since the early 1880s.

History

The Elder Conservatorium of Music was formally constituted in 1898 as the result of a major philanthropic bequest from the will of the Scottish-Australian pastoralist, Sir Thomas Elder, whose statue stands outside Elder Hall.  The history, however, goes back further than 1898.  An earlier philanthropic donation from Sir Thomas Elder had helped to establish the Elder Professorship of Music in 1883, with the first incumbent taking up the post in 1884. At the same time, Sir Thomas Elder had established endowment funds for the Royal College of Music in London to support  the Elder Overseas Scholarship (in Music) and the Music Board of the University of Adelaide to support the Elder Scholarships in Music. 1883 was also the year in which Berlin-trained pianist Immanuel Gotthold Reimann founded his privately owned and run Adelaide College of Music, of which Cecil Sharp (later to become famous as collector of folk songs) became co-director in 1889. For the first few years the new school of music at the University of Adelaide (which focussed on composition and theory) and the Adelaide College of Music (which focussed on practical training in performance) complemented each other. In 1898 the two schools were merged, operating in the college's Wakefield Street premises until 1900, when the North Terrace building was completed. Hermann Heinicke founded the first Conservatorium Orchestra.

The Elder Conservatorium of Music is a product of three mergers: one in the late nineteenth century (1898) with the Adelaide College of Music; one in the late twentieth century (1991), with the School of Performing Arts of the then South Australian College of Advanced Education; and one at the beginning of the twenty-first century (2001), with the School of Music of the Adelaide Institute of TAFE (aka Flinders Street School of Music). Formerly a faculty of the university (the Faculty of Music) it is now constituted as a professional School within the Faculty of Arts. Since 2002 it has been an associate member of the Association of European Conservatoires (AEC), and is also a partner school of the Helpmann Academy, an umbrella body created by the State Government of South Australia to promote collaboration between various schools of visual and performing arts.

There have so far been only seven incumbents of the Elder Professorship of Music, all of whom have also served as director and/or dean of the Elder Conservatorium of Music and have provided the artistic and academic leadership for the institution: professor Joshua Ives (1884–1901); professor J. Matthew Ennis (1902–1918); Professor Dr. E. Harold Davies (1918–1948); pianist and arts administrator, Professor John Bishop, OBE (1948–1964); the tenor, Professor David Galliver, AM (1966–1983); German conductor, Professor Heribert Esser (1986–1993); and composer, Professor Dr. Charles Bodman Rae (since 2001). Since the late 1970s the administrative position of director of the Conservatorium has from time to time been occupied by a staff member other than the Elder Professor of Music. In this category can be included: the clarinettist, David Shepherd; the pianist, Clemens Leske AM; the horn player, Patrick Brislan; the pianist, David Lockett AM; and the choral conductor, Carl Crossin OAM. Since 2014 the director has been the noted composer, Professor Graeme Koehne, AO.

In 1886, Professor Ives established the first Australian public music examinations system, modelled on that of the Guildhall School of Music in London. This directly led to the establishment of the Australian Music Examinations Board (AMEB). In 1898, through the Elder Conservatorium, the University of Adelaide was the first in Australia to establish regulations for the degree of Doctor of Music (DMus), and in 1902, Edward Harold Davies was awarded the first Australian doctorate of music. In 1918 the university became the first in Australia to award a doctorate in music to a woman, Ruby Davy. In addition to Davies and Davy, recipients of the DMus award have included: Tristram Cary, OAM; Sir Peter Maxwell Davies, CBE; Graeme Koehne; Charles Bodman Rae; David Lockett, AM; and Ross Edwards, AM.

In addition to the Elder Professors, many composers and performing musicians have been members of staff, including: Sir Peter Maxwell Davies (composition fellow); Prof. David Cubbin (flute); Clive Carey (singing); Jiří Tancibudek (oboe); Gabor Reeves (clarinet); Beryl Kimber (violin); Clemens Leske (piano); James Whitehead (cello); Lance Dossor (piano); Richard Meale (composition); Tristram Cary (electronic music); Janis Laurs, cello; Keith Crellin, OAM (violist); Graeme Koehne (composition); Stephen Whittington (composition, piano, computer music) Stefan Ammer (piano); Lucinda Collins (piano). From 1978 to 1994 Prof. Andrew McCredie held a personal chair in musicology. The Australian String Quartet was established in 1985 and since 1991 has been quartet-in-residence at the Elder Conservatorium.

The Bishop years are generally considered to have been some of the most exciting and progressive in the history of the Elder Conservatorium, with initiatives such as the appointment of the University of Adelaide Wind Quintet, and the establishment of the Adelaide Festival of Arts (of which Bishop was the inaugural artistic director).  The years since the appointment of Bodman Rae in 2001 also witnessed transformational changes that re-established the position of the Elder Conservatorium as one of Australia's leading music academies. In 2005 the Elder Conservatorium received a Classical Music Award (from the Australasian Performing Rights Association) for "outstanding contribution by an organisation" (the only Australian music academy to have won such an award), in recognition of its music program for the 2004 Adelaide Festival of Arts (curated by Bodman Rae).  In 2011, 2013, 2015, and for the last two years the Elder Conservatorium hosted the National Music Camp (Australian Youth Orchestra's annual summer school, founded by Bishop), which is Australia's largest annual musical event.

Non-traditional research activities range across performance studies (classical, jazz, pop and electronica), composition, music curatorial studies, music industry entrepreneurship, and digital arts and related multi-media. The Conservatorium is co-host to two research aggregations: the Sia Furler Institute for Contemporary Music and Media, and the JM Coetzee Centre for Creative Practice.

Academic programs

The Elder Conservatorium of Music has been awarding degrees and diplomas in music to both men and women since the end of the nineteenth century.  It was originally intended that the degree program be modelled on that at the University of Cambridge.  It is true that Professor Ives had graduated (albeit as an external candidate) with the MusB degree from Cambridge, and the academic robes are based on those from Cambridge, but the degree programs of the University of Adelaide were – and to a large extent still are – based on the Scottish rather than English model.  This reflects the fact that most of  the founding fathers of the university were Scots. Furthermore, the Cambridge MusB degree was taken as a second, postgraduate degree, whereas the Elder Conservatorium's BMus degree is a first degree award. Whereas women were not able to graduate from the University of Cambridge until shortly after the Second World War, they were graduating from the Elder Conservatorium of Music (and the University of Adelaide as a whole) fifty years earlier.

The Elder Conservatorium offers two main Undergraduate programs, with the following specialisations. Postgraduate awards include Graduate Diplomas in Performance and Pedagogy, and Music Performance; Master's Degrees in Performance Studies and Performance and Pedagogy and Graduate Certificate in Music Teaching.

Undergraduate programs

Diploma in Music 

 Diploma in Music (Music Production)
 Diploma in Music (Song writing & Commercial Music)

Bachelor of Music 

 Bachelor of Music (Classical Voice) 
 Bachelor of Music (Music Performance – Classical)
 Bachelor of Music (Music Composition) 
 Bachelor of Music (Music Performance – Jazz) 
 Bachelor of Music (Music Education and Pedagogy) 
 Bachelor of Music (Musicology) 
 Bachelor of Music (Popular Music)
 Bachelor of Music (Sonic Arts)
 Bachelor of Music Advanced
 Bachelor of Music Advanced Performance – Classical Voice
 Bachelor of Music Advanced Performance – Classical Performance
 Bachelor of Music Advanced Performance – Jazz Performance 
 Bachelor of Music Advanced Creative Arts – Composition 
 Bachelor of Music Advanced Creative Arts – Popular Music 
 Bachelor of Music Advanced Creative Arts – Sonic Arts 
 Bachelor of Music Advanced Research – Musicology
 Bachelor of Music Advanced Research – Music Education
 Bachelor of Music Theatre

Honours 

 Honours Degree of Bachelor of Music (Classical Voice)  
 Honours Degree of Bachelor of Music (Music Composition)  
 Honours Degree of Bachelor of Music (Music Performance – Classical)  
 Honours Degree of Bachelor of Music (Music Performance – Jazz)  
 Honours Degree of Bachelor of Music (Musicology)  
 Honours Degree of Bachelor of Music (Popular Music & Creative Technologies)  
 Honours Degree of Bachelor of Music (Sonic Arts)

Postgraduate Programs

Graduate Diploma in Music and Master of Music 

 Classical Performance: Brass (French horn, trumpet, trombone, tuba, euphonium)
 Classical Performance: Conducting
 Classical Performance: Keyboard (piano, organ, harpsichord)
 Classical Performance: Percussion (tuned and untuned classical percussion) 
 Classical Performance: Strings (violin, viola, cello, double bass, guitar, harp) 
 Classical Performance: Voice 
 Classical Performance: Woodwind: (flute, oboe, clarinet, bassoon, recorder, saxophone) 
 Jazz Performance (trumpet, trombone, saxophone, guitar, bass, piano, drums, voice)

The degree of Master of Philosophy is offered for the specializations of Composition, Musicology, Music Education, Music Performance, Music Performance, Pedagogy and Sonic Arts. Specializations for the degree of Doctor of Philosophy include Composition, Musicology, Music Education, Music Performance and Sonic Arts.

Associate in Music, University of Adelaide
Associate in Music, University of Adelaide (AMUA) was a degree conferred by the university. It was initially introduced in 1900 as a diploma course, predating the formation of the Australian Music Examinations Board (AMEB) in 1918. It was phased out in 1972. Notable graduates included: Maude Mary Puddy, (first graduate, 1900);
Clytie Hine, 1908; and
Arnold Matters, 1926.

Facilities

Elder Hall

Elder Hall is one of Australia's concert halls. Building commenced in 1898 and it was officially opened in 1900 by the then Governor of South Australia, Lord Tennyson. Its interior features a hammer-beam roof modelled on the Middle Temple in London, and a three-manual organ built by Casavant Frères of Canada.  Elder Hall is the primary focus of the Conservatorium's successful annual concert series. Conservatorium concerts are also given in several other locations, including the Adelaide Town Hall, and St Peter's (Anglican) Cathedral in North Adelaide.

Electronic Music Unit
The Electronic Music Unit (EMU) is the hub of music technology, sound production, sonic arts and electronic music at the Elder Conservatorium.
Formerly known as the Elder Electronic Music Studio (1962–1994) and the Performing Arts Technology Unit (1994- 2001) it was founded in 1962 as a result of the engagement of Dr. Henk Badings as composer in residence at the Elder Conservatorium. Its facilities include recording studios, computer suites, and a collection of analogue synthesizers dating back to the 1960s.  It is also used as a public venue for concerts of contemporary and experimental music. It was the first such studio in Australia. Many composers have been associated with it, including Henk Badings, Peter Tahourdin, Tristram Cary (the designer of the legendary VCS3 synthesizer), Martin Wesley-Smith and Stephen Whittington. EMU offers programs providing knowledge and skills in music technology, such as sound engineering, sound designing for games or films, electronic composition or performance, and software for plug-in development or sound art.

Performing ensembles

Classical Choirs 
Carl Crossin OAM has been head of Choral Music at the Conservatorium since 2002 when the current choral program was initiated. He is also artistic director and conductor of Adelaide Chamber Singers and was awarded an OAM for his services to music (choral music in particular) in the 2007 Australia Day Honours List.

Elder Conservatorium Chorale 

The Elder Conservatorium Chorale is a mixed voice choir that draws its membership from the Elder Conservatorium of Music, the University of Adelaide at large, other universities, and from the wider community. As well as putting on their own concerts as part of the Elder Conservatorium's Concert Series, the choir regular performs with the Adelaide Symphony Orchestra.

Bella Voce 

Bella Voce is a female voice choir.

Orchestras

Elder Conservatorium Symphony Orchestra 

The Elder Conservatorium Symphony Orchestra (ECSO), conducted by Luke Dollman, consists mainly of full-time students from the Conservatorium's music programs and also includes some students from other faculties within the university.

Elder Conservatorium Wind Orchestra 

The Elder Conservatorium Wind Orchestra is conducted by Luke Dollman.

Elder Conservatorium Chamber Orchestra 

Founded in 1973 by the late Jiri Tancibudek, the Elder Conservatorium Chamber Orchestra draws on advanced students from the Conservatorium. Currently directed by Elizabeth Layton.

Jazz Ensembles

Adelaide Connection 

The Adelaide Connection is the Elder Conservatorium's premier Jazz Choir. Under the direction of Anita Wardell, the group consists of between 15 and 18 students and has a mixture of soprano, alto, tenor and bass voices. The Connection have built a repertoire of harmonically sophisticated vocal music, both a cappella and accompanied. The majority of the vocal arrangements focus on close part harmony and complex jazz rhythms and sight reading is a strong focus for this ensemble. To strengthen the students' knowledge of jazz history, chosen repertoire includes music from early jazz choir arrangers such as Gene Puerling to current arrangers such as Darmon Meader and Kerry Marsh.

Elder Conservatorium Big Band 

Under the long time direction of Hal Hall and now Dusty Cox, the Big Band has showcased a broad range of material from the traditions of Basie and Ellington to contemporary music. The ensemble has worked with many 'jazz giants', including James Morrison, Lee Konitz, Errol Buddle, Don Burrows and many others. It has appeared at the Manly Jazz Festival three times; in 1995 it featured at the Monsalvat Jazz Festival, and in 2002 performed at the Wangaratta Jazz Festival. The Big Band has also toured extensively throughout South Australia and in 1994 it produced a CD, Live at the Walker's Arms and completed a studio recording in 2008.

Elder Conservatorium Latin Jazz Ensemble 

The Latin Jazz Ensemble, directed by Mark Ferguson, was formed in 2009 as the Latin Ensemble to replace three previous student ensembles; Big Band 3, the Jazz Percussion Ensemble and the Keyboard Ensemble. It is a training ensemble; a stepping stone into the Big Band 1. In 2012 it was rebadged as the Cuban Ensemble and the repertoire now focuses on music from the Caribbean, Colombia and New Orleans.

Elder Conservatorium Guitar Ensemble 
The Elder Conservatorium Guitar Ensemble is directed by Oliver Fartach-Naini constitutes a core component of the Elder Conservatorium's classical guitar program. Most of its members are full-time music students.

Institutional links 
The Elder Conservatorium is affiliated with music institutions including the Adelaide Symphony Orchestra, the Australian String Quartet and the State Opera of South Australia.

Adelaide Symphony Orchestra 
The Adelaide Symphony Orchestra (ASO) is South Australia's largest performing arts organisation, established in 1936. The orchestra, which is based a short walk from the Conservatorium, provides opportunities for occasional training experience for selected classical performance and composition students. A recent initiative provides for the joining of forces between the ASO and the Elder Conservatorium to offer a conducting program. It is the first time an Australian university and orchestra have collaborated on such a degree program for conductors. Students can study for a Master of Music degree, a Graduate Diploma, or do an Honours year majoring conducting.

Australian String Quartet 
The Australian String Quartet (ASQ) is Quartet-in-Residence at the University of Adelaide.

Collaborative activities include performances in the Elder Hall lunch hour and evening series concerts, composer forums, chamber music workshops, participation in 1:1 teaching and mentoring opportunities.

State Opera of South Australia 
State Opera of South Australia (SOSA) is a professional opera company in Adelaide, South Australia, established in 1976. Each year, the State Opera presents at least two major operatic productions at the Adelaide Festival Theatre as well as producing or supporting other smaller productions in the Opera Studio at Netley. Conservatorium graduates in Classical Voice often find employment as professional singers with the State Opera, usually through the Young Artists program, and most of SOSA's current principal singers and many of its chorus are Conservatorium graduates. In addition, the Conservatorium has recently established an ongoing partnership with SOSA that offers student internships and produces a full operatic production each year. This collaboration involves both the Conservatorium's Classical Voice cohort and the symphony orchestra.

Sources

Bridges, Doreen: More Than a Musician: a life of E. Harold Davies (Melbourne: Australian Scholarly Publishing, 2006) 185pp.
W. D. K. Duncan and R. A. Leonard: Chapter 4, 'The Music Men' in The University of Adelaide 1874-1974 (Adelaide: Rigby, 1973) 203pp.
Lauer, Helena: The role of the first five Elder Professors in the development of music in the Elder Conservatorium, 1885-1985 (MA diss.; University of Adelaide, 1998), 192pp.
Symons, Christopher: John Bishop: a life for music (Melbourne: Hyland House Publishing, 1989) 336pp.
Edgeloe, Victor: The Language of Human Feeling: A Brief History of Music in the University of Adelaide (Adelaide : University of Adelaide, 1985) 89pp.
University of Adelaide Archives: Series 108 - University of Adelaide Calendars.

External links
The Elder Conservatorium of Music Retrieved 4 January 2021.

Music schools in Australia
Education in Adelaide
University of Adelaide
South Australian Heritage Register